El Cobre is a rural town in the municipality of San Martín de Hidalgo in the Mexican state of Jalisco. The town is in between the towns of Lagunillas and Mesa del Cobre, in Sierra de Quila, Jalisco's second-largest forest reserve.

The town is topographically settled on top of a mesa with deposits of copper, hence its name of El Cobre, meaning "the copper". El Cobre is the municipality's smallest municipal agency, and counts with 36 inhabitants as of 2010.

External links
PueblosAmerica.com - El Cobre

Populated places in Jalisco